Fiji competed at the 1984 Summer Olympics in Los Angeles, United States.  The nation returned to the Summer Games after participating in the American-led boycott of the 1980 Summer Olympics. Fourteen competitors, eleven men and three women, took part in twenty-two events in five sports.

Athletics

Key
Note–Ranks given for track events are within the athlete's heat only
Q = Qualified for the next round
q = Qualified for the next round as a fastest loser or, in field events, by position without achieving the qualifying target

Track events

Combined event – Decathlon

Cycling

One cyclists represented Fiji in 1984.

Road

Judo

Sailing

 Tony Philp

Swimming

Men's 100m Freestyle 
Samuela Tupou
 Heat — 55.85 (→ did not advance, 54th place)
Warren Sorby
 Heat — 56.75 (→ did not advance, 57th place)

Men's 200m Freestyle
 Samuela Tupou
 Heat — 2:02.22 (→ did not advance, 46th place)

Men's 100m Backstroke 
Warren Sorby
 Heat — 1:05.81 (→ did not advance, 40th place)

Men's 100m Butterfly
Warren Sorby
 Heat — 1:05.53 (→ did not advance, 48th place)
Samuela Tupou
 Heat — 1:07.75 (→ did not advance, 51st place)

Men's 200m Individual Medley
Samuela Tupou
 Heat — 2:19.79 (→ did not advance, 34th place)
Warren Sorby
 Heat — 2:22.74 (→ did not advance, 39th place)

Women's 100m Freestyle
Sharon Pickering
 Heat — 1:04.25 (→ did not advance, 43rd place)

Women's 200m Freestyle
Sharon Pickering
 Heat — 2:19.31 (→ did not advance, 35th place)

Women's 100m Backstroke
 Sharon Pickering
 Heat — 1:10.49 (→ did not advance, 29th place)

Women's 200m Individual Medley
Sharon Pickering
 Heat — 2:34.77 (→ did not advance, 26th place)

References

External links
Official Olympic Reports

Nations at the 1984 Summer Olympics
1984
1984 in Fijian sport